Matsudaira Nobutsune may refer to:
Matsudaira Nobutsune (Sasayama) (1666–1717), Rōjū and daimyō of Sasayama Domain
Matsudaira Nobutsune (Kaminoyama) (1844–1918), daimyō of Kaminoyama Domain

See also:
Matsudaira Nobutsuna